BNP Paribas Asset Management is the dedicated, autonomous asset management business of BNP Paribas Group.

History 
In 2007, BNP Paribas regrouped its function in asset management under the brand name BNP Paribas Investment Partners.

In 2010, the closing of the transaction between BNP Paribas Investment Partners and Fortis Investments was completed.

In June 2017, BNP Paribas Investment Partners rebrands as BNP Paribas Asset Management.

Products and services 
BNP Paribas Investments Partners provides:

Developed equities
Developed fixed income
Emerging markets
Multi-asset solutions
Protected, indexed & model-driven management strategies
Sustainable investments
Specialised investments
Advisory

Locations 
BNP Paribas Asset Management has offices all over the global.

The headquarters are in Paris, France. They also have a presence across much of Europe, North America, South and Central America, Asia, Australia and the Middle East.

References 

BNP Paribas
Investment management companies of France